Alessandro Giustiniani Longo (Genoa, 1554 – Genoa, 1631) was the 89th Doge of the Republic of Genoa.

Biography 
Exponent of the so-called "new" nobility, he was elected to the highest dogal position with the elections of April 6, 1611, the forty-fourth in biennial succession and the eighty-ninth in republican history. Of his Dogate are remembered the final negotiations for the acquisition of the city of Sassello. After his Doge's mandate ended on April 6, 1613 he was elected to the office of perpetual prosecutor. He died in the Genoese capital in 1631.

See also 

 Republic of Genoa
 Doge of Genoa

References 

17th-century Doges of Genoa
1554 births
1631 deaths